Gogołowice  is a village in the administrative district of Gmina Lubin, within Lubin County, Lower Silesian Voivodeship, in south-western Poland. It was first mentioned in a 1267 deed as Old Polish Gogolevicci. Prior to 1945 belonged to Germany.

References

Villages in Lubin County